Basketball at the 2009 Games of the Small States of Europe was held from 2 to 6 June 2009. Games were played at the Eleftheria Indoor Hall, in Nicosia.

Medal summary

Men's tournament
Men's tournament was played with a round-robin group composed by six teams.

Table

Women's tournament
Women's tournament was played by only four teams.

Table

References

External links
Cyprus 2009 Official Website

Small
2009 Games of the Small States of Europe
2009
International basketball competitions hosted by Cyprus